Jayashankar is an Indian given name and surname. It is formed from the Sanskrit words  'victorious' and  'beneficent'. The latter word is a reference to Shiva (see Shankar). By the process of schwa syncope,  becomes  in many modern Indian languages, resulting in the name also being spelled Jaishankar. People with these names include:

Jaishankar Bhojak (1889–1975), Indian actor and director of Gujarati theatre
Jaishankar Prasad (1889–1937), Indian writer prominent in modern Hindi literature
Kothapalli Jayashankar (1934–2011), Telangana movement activist
Jaishankar (1938–2000), Indian actor known for his work in Tamil cinema
Thiruvizha Jayashankar (born 1940), Indian classical musician
S. Jaishankar (born 1955), Indian diplomat
Jaishankar Menon (born 1956), Indian-born American computer scientist
A. Jayashankar (born 1962), Indian lawyer based in Kerala
M. Jaishankar (1977–2018), Indian serial killer
Shvetha Jaishankar (born 1978), Indian model and businesswoman
Karuppannan Jaishankar, Indian criminologist
Vedam Jaishankar, Indian cricket correspondent from Karnataka

References

Hindu given names
Hindu surnames